MV Lairds Loch was a passenger and cargo vessel built for the Irish Sea crossing.

History
Built in 1944 for Burns & Laird Line, MV Lairds Loch operated from Glasgow, initially to Derry and later to Dublin.

In 1969 she was sold to Israeli owners, and on 16 November 1969 was attacked by Arab frogmen and beached near Eilat. Repaired and returned to service, she ran aground on 7 September 1970 in the Gulf of Aqaba and was a total loss.

Service
MV Lairds Loch was primarily employed on the Glasgow to Derry service, though she later worked on the Glasgow to Dublin route.

Footnotes

Ferries of the United Kingdom
1944 ships